Larry Stefanki was the defending champion but lost in the second round to David Pate.

Joakim Nyström won in the final 6–1, 6–3, 6–2 against Yannick Noah.

Seeds
The top eight seeds received a bye into the second round.

  Mats Wilander (quarterfinals)
  Jimmy Connors (semifinals)
  Boris Becker (quarterfinals)
  Yannick Noah (final)
  Joakim Nyström (champion)
  Johan Kriek (second round)
  Scott Davis (second round)
  Jimmy Arias (third round)
  David Pate (quarterfinals)
  Thierry Tulasne (semifinals)
  Jan Gunnarsson (first round)
  Peter Lundgren (second round)
  Matt Anger (second round)
  Jakob Hlasek (first round)
  Andreas Maurer (first round)
  Aaron Krickstein (third round)

Draw

Finals

Top half

Section 1

Section 2

Bottom half

Section 3

Section 4

References
1986 Pilot Pen Classic Draw - Men's Doubles

Pilot Pen Classic - Singles